Jeff Currie is an economist and the Global Head of Commodities Research in the Global Investment Research Division at Goldman Sachs. He rose to prominence during the 2000s by forecasting the commodity super-cycle and oil spiking above $100 a barrel. He has been labelled a "maverick" for making bold calls that 'pack a punch'. During the 2010s he was known for forecasting oil prices to stay 'lower for longer' to end the shale supply glut, whilst in more recent times his stance has shifted from bearish to considerably bullish, calling for a new commodities "supercycle" in late 2020 driven by underinvestment in supply, a process he has dubbed "the revenge of the old economy."

Early life 

Born in Reno, Nevada, Currie attended Sprague High School in Salem, Oregon, before attending Pepperdine University, in Malibu, California, where he obtained a Bachelor of Arts Economics in December 1987.

Currie earned a Master of Arts Economics at the University of Chicago in December 1990, and a PhD in economics from the university in June 1996.

Career 

Currie joined Goldman Sachs in 1996, where he became Managing Director in 2002 before being named Global Head of Commodities Research in 2006, and a partner in 2008. Between 2010 and 2012, Currie was the European co-head of Economics, Commodities and Strategy Research, where he was based in London.

In July 2003, Currie was selected as one of eight leading gas and energy executives by the United States Senate House Energy and Commerce Committee to discuss the then natural gas supply-demand imbalance.

In April 2004, Currie warned of the 'revenge of the old economy' after decades of a lack of investment in the old economy, claiming that higher commodity prices were likely needed to attracted capital. Three months later, in July 2004, Currie authored a Goldman Sachs report that forecasted rising long-term oil prices, arguing that the 'global oil industry is at capacity'.

In March 2007, Currie authored a Goldman Sachs report title Food, Feed and Fuel, which argued the demand pull from food, feed and fuel represented the beginning of a structural increase in prices. Several months later, in July 2007, Currie discussed with Bloomberg the potential impact rising oil prices could have on the global economy. He correctly predicted that oil prices would 'exceed $90 by the end of 2007.

Currie jolted global commodity markets in April 2011 by closing a Chinathemed trading recommendation to be long a basket of crude oil, copper, cotton and platinum (CCCP). The Commodity Market crashed several weeks later. Currie then correctly foresaw the biggest decline in the price of gold for three decades, in April 2013, two days ahead of the crash.

Currie co-authored a Goldman Sachs Report in June 2014, titled 'Unlocking the economic potential of North America's energy resources', published at the North American Energy Summit. The report called for a focus on unlocking North America's natural gas potential. Later that year, in October 2014, Currie discussed the 'New Oil Order', arguing that the United States' shale revolution was reshaping global energy markets and forcing them to reassess supply and demand balance.

At the beginning of 2015, Currie forecasted that oil prices would stay 'lower for longer'.

In November 2017, during an interview with Bloomberg, Currie stated that Bitcoin should be considered a commodity that shares many similarities with gold.

He is a regular commentator on commodity markets and cryptocurrency, featuring on Sky News, Bloomberg and CNBC.

In November 2020, The Daily Telegraph referred to Currie as the "world's most followed energy guru" and reported on his convictions on a new commodity supercycle. Currie predicted Brent prices to reach $65 in the last quarter of 2021. Then, at the end of 2020, Currie argued that a long-lasting bull market for commodities had started.

In January 2021, The Economist also reported on the possibility of a new supercycle, quoting Currie's assertion that the Covid-19 pandemic could represent a "catalyst for a commodity supercycle".

In light of the surge in attention around Gamestop stock, spurred on by social media platform Reddit, Currie questioned the potential influence of retail investors on commodity markets during an interview with Bloomberg in February 2021.

Awards & honours 

Currie's PhD thesis, titled The Geographic Extent of the Market: Theory and Application to US Petroleum Market, won the Zellner Thesis Award from the American Statistical Association in 1997.

In 2011, City A.M. named Currie as the CNBC Analyst of the Year.

References 

Living people
1966 births
People from Salem, Oregon
Economists from Oregon
21st-century American economists